Henry Charles VanSant (June 6, 1935 – March 16, 2006) was an American football player and coach. He played college football at East Carolina University and later served as an assistant football coach and assistant athletic director there.

Van Sant served as the head football coach at Guilford College in Greensboro, North Carolina in 1973. He later served as the head football coach at Lenoir–Rhyne College in Lenoir, North Carolina from 1980 to 1983.

Head coaching record

References

External links
 

1935 births
2006 deaths
East Carolina Pirates football players
East Carolina Pirates football coaches
Guilford Quakers football coaches
Lenoir–Rhyne Bears football coaches
People from Hampton, Virginia
Players of American football from Virginia